The mandrill is the world's largest species of monkey.

Mandrill may also refer to:
 Mandrill (band), an American funk band from Brooklyn, New York, formed in 1968
 Mandrill (album), the band's self-titled debut album
 Mandrill (comics), a fictional Marvel Comics character who is a mutant supervillain
 Mandrill Studios, a recording studio in Parnell, a suburb of Auckland, New Zealand
 A miner's smallish pickaxe for use in confined spaces
 A character in Rhythm Heaven Fever

See also
 Mandrel, a device
 MANDRIL, software